John Hartley may refer to:

John Anderson Hartley (1844–1896), Australian educator
John Hartley (academic), Australian academic, professor of cultural studies
Jock Hartley (John Cabourn Hartley, 1874–1963), cricketer played for Oxford University, Sussex CCC and England
John Hartley (general), Australian major general
John Hartley, one half of Nottinghamshire musical duo Phil and John
John Hartley (poet) (1839–1915), Yorkshire
John Hartley (tennis) (1849–1935), English clergyman who won Wimbledon